No Nukes: The Muse Concerts For a Non-Nuclear Future was a 1979 triple live album that contained selections from the September 1979 Madison Square Garden concerts by the Musicians United for Safe Energy collective. Jackson Browne, Graham Nash, Bonnie Raitt, and John Hall were the key organizers of the event and guiding forces behind the album.

This was the first official appearance of Bruce Springsteen and the E Street Band's live act on record, and their "Detroit Medley", a staple of the encores of their regular shows, achieved considerable album-oriented rock airplay.  In 2021, Springsteen officially released a compilation of songs he performed in his sets from the shows as the live album The Legendary 1979 No Nukes Concerts.

Otherwise the album did not get much radio attention, as many of the artists held back their best-known material from appearing on it or emphasized collaborative performances.  The album was certified a gold record by the RIAA in September 1980. It was reissued as a two-CD set by Elektra Records in October 1997.

The No Nukes film was also released in May 1980 from this event, although it contained somewhat varying contents from this album.

Track listing

Side 1 

"Dependin' on You" (Patrick Simmons, Michael McDonald) – The Doobie Brothers – 4:44
 "Runaway" (Del Shannon, Max Crook) – Bonnie Raitt – 3:53
 "Angel from Montgomery" (John Prine) – Bonnie Raitt – 3:48
 "Plutonium Is Forever" (John & Johanna Hall) – John Hall – 3:22
 "Power" (John & Johanna Hall) – The Doobie Brothers with John Hall and James Taylor – 5:23

Side 2 

 "The Times They Are A-Changin'" (Bob Dylan) – James Taylor, Carly Simon and Graham Nash – 3:00
 "Cathedral" (Graham Nash) – Graham Nash – 6:03
 "The Crow on the Cradle" (Sydney Carter) – Jackson Browne and Graham Nash – 5:04
 "Before the Deluge" (Jackson Browne) – Jackson Browne – 6:27

Side 3 

 "Lotta Love" (Neil Young) – Nicolette Larson and The Doobie Brothers – 3:33
 "Little Sister" (Doc Pomus, Mort Shuman) – Ry Cooder – 3:56
 "A Woman" (Connie Brooks, Patricia Johnson) – Sweet Honey in the Rock – 1:28
 "We Almost Lost Detroit" (Gil Scott-Heron) – Gil Scott-Heron – 4:44
 "Get Together" (Chet Powers) – Jesse Colin Young – 4:52

Side 4 

 "You Can't Change That" (Ray Parker Jr.) – Raydio – 3:33
 "Once You Get Started" (Gavin Christopher) – Chaka Khan – 5:10
 "Captain Jim's Drunken Dream" (James Taylor) – James Taylor – 4:19
 "Honey Don't Leave L.A." (Danny Kortchmar) – James Taylor – 3:45
 "Mockingbird" (Inez and Charlie Foxx) – James Taylor and Carly Simon – 3:57

Side 5 

 "Heart of the Night" (Paul Cotton) – Poco – 6:09
 "Cry to Me" (Bert Berns) – Tom Petty and the Heartbreakers – 3:30
 "Stay" (Maurice Williams) – Bruce Springsteen & The E Street Band with Jackson Browne and Rosemary Butler – 4:14
 "Detroit Medley": "Devil with the Blue Dress" (Shorty Long, Mickey Stevenson), "Good Golly, Miss Molly" (Robert Blackwell, John Marascalco), "Jenny Take a Ride" (Enotris Johnson, Richard Penniman, Bob Crewe) – Bruce Springsteen & The E Street Band – 4:49

Side 6 

 "You Don't Have to Cry" (Stephen Stills) – Crosby, Stills & Nash – 3:04
 "Long Time Gone" (David Crosby) – Crosby, Stills & Nash – 5:23
 "Teach Your Children" (Graham Nash) – Crosby, Stills & Nash – 3:05
 "Takin' It to the Streets" (Michael McDonald) – The Doobie Brothers and James Taylor – 4:37

Charts

Production credits
 Audio Recording: Record Plant NY Black Truck, Chief Engineer: David Hewitt
 Greg Ladanyi, Stanley Johnston, Dennis Kirk, Don Gooch, Jimmy Iovine - Engineers
 Joe Chiccarelli - Engineering
 Remote Crew: Phil Gitomer, Michael Guthrie, Dana Lester, Kooster McAllister, Paul Prestopino, David "DB" Brown, and John Venable

Production crew
 John Badenhop
 Eric Barrett
 Tim Bernett
 David Bernstein
 Joel Bernstein
 Mark Brickman
 Rance Caldwell
 Bob Chirmside
 Rusty Conway
 Ivan Crews
 Joe Crowley
 Jim DeLuca
 Tony DeMattia
 Denny Densmore
 Chip Dox
 Pat Farrell
 David Faison
 Richard Fernandez
 Chuck Fitzpatrick
 Bill "Doc" Gans
 Glenn Goodwin
 Tom Hansen
 Denis Heron
 Armando Hurley
 Jeffrey Husband
 Grey Ingram
 Bruce Jackson
 Buford Jones
 Dennis Jones
 Phyllis Kaufman
 Leroy Kerr
 Edd Kolakowski
 Donnie Kretzschmar
 Lewis Lee
 Tom Littrell
 Clyde Llewellyn
 Robin Magruder
 Rob Marchner
 Jeff Mason
 Mary Newton
 Steve Nutting
 Alan Owen
 C.J.Patterson 
 Steve Pearlman
 Ron Penny
 Bob Pope
 Dennis Scrimo
 B.J.Schiller
 Dixie Swanson
 George Van Ostrum
 Michael Valvano
 Larry Wallace
 Marty Woolf
 Joe Hill

References 

Anti–nuclear weapons movement
1979 live albums
Asylum Records live albums
Three Mile Island accident
Albums recorded at Madison Square Garden